Samantha Cole (born October 19, 1978) is an American singer-songwriter.

Early life
Samantha Cole grew up in Southampton, New York. At the age of 15, Cole began taking vocal lessons and landed a number of singing engagements in New York.

Career 
Cole made some 30 appearances (and one performance) on MTV's The Grind, and became a regular performer at Tatou in New York City. Through these appearances, Cole was discovered by Universal Music's Doug Morris and Daniel Glass, and promptly signed to Universal Records.

Cole's eponymous debut album was released in 1997. Cole co-wrote eight songs on the album, which included an impressive roster of all-star producers including David Foster, Nile Rodgers, Richard Marx, Rhett Lawrence, and Diane Warren. Cole's debut single "Happy With You" peaked at #78 on the Billboard Hot 100. The follow-up single, "Without You", failed to chart. The song was covered by American Idol stars Kimberley Locke and Clay Aiken in 2004, and went to #1 in Asia. The song is featured on Locke's album, One Love. Cole went on to release her last single from her debut album, "You Light Up My Life", in the UK in 1997.

In 2001, Cole was featured on the single "Luv Me Luv Me", by Jamaican reggae singer Shaggy. Her version of the single with Shaggy did not peak on any chart in the US, but did peak at #5 on the UK Singles Chart. In 2002, Cole teamed up with Shaggy for the second time for the song "Bring It To Me", that was featured on the Dark Angel soundtrack.

In 2005, Cole released a cover version of Animotion's 1985 hit, "Obsession". The song charted high on the Hot Dance Music/Club Play chart and gained radio airplay.

Since releasing "Obsession", she has remained a staple of New York City discothèque club scene, regularly performing to sold-out crowds. Cole has also modeled and has appeared in layouts for FHM and Loaded.  She is reportedly working on her second album entitled Superwoman, on a new label, Alpha Omega Records.

Cole has also dabbled in acting, appearing in an episode of HBO's Sex and the City, the WE network reality show, Single In the Hamptons, and the Damon Dash's 2003 film, Death of a Dynasty.

Discography

Albums
 Samantha Cole (September 23, 1997)
 Down in Love
 Happy with You
 I'm Right Here
 Sometimes
 Without You
 Surrender to Me
 Sweet Sweet Surrender
 Crazy
 I'm By Your Side
 You Light Up My Life
 What You Do to Me
 Shadow of Love

Singles
"Happy with You" (August 12, 1997)
 Happy with You [Radio Version]
 Happy with You [Instrumental]

"Without You" (December 9, 1997)
 Without You
 Down in Love [Excerpt]
 Sweet Sweet Surrender [Excerpt]
 I'm Right Here
 What You Do to Me

"You Light Up My Life" (UK release, 1998)
 You Light Up My Life [Messy Club Mix]
 You Light Up My Life [Messy Dub Mix]
 You Light Up My Life [Messy Radio Mix of Club Mix]
 You Light Up My Life [Album Version]
 Shadow of Love

"Luv Me, Luv Me" (With Shaggy, 2001)
"Obsession (2005)
"Bring It to Me" (2005)
"Bring It to Me" (Dark Angel Remix) (2005)

References

External links
Superwoman: Samantha Cole Official Site

American women singer-songwriters
American women pop singers
American house musicians
American dance musicians
Singer-songwriters from New York (state)
People from Southampton (town), New York
Living people
1978 births
21st-century American women singers
21st-century American singers